Gnaeus Calpurnius Piso may refer to:

 Gnaeus Calpurnius Piso (consul 23 BC)
 Gnaeus Calpurnius Piso (consul 7 BC)

See also

 
 Calpurnius Piso (disambiguation)